So Many Ways is the debut album by American R&B vocal group The Braxtons. Released on August 6, 1996, the album produced four singles; "So Many Ways", "Only Love", "The Boss" – which peaked at number-one in the Billboard Dance Charts – and "Slow Flow". "So Many Ways" peaked at No. 26 on the Billboard R&B/Hip-Hop Albums charts and No. 3 on the Heatseekers Albums chart.

Background
The Braxtons originally started out in 1989. They first signed as a fivesome to Arista Records which consisted of Toni Braxton and her four sisters, Tamar, Trina, Towanda and Traci.  In 1990, they released their first single "Good Life". It would be their only single as a fivesome. "Good Life" failed to become a hit and The Braxtons were dropped from Arista Records. Despite the single's underwhelming performance, Toni Braxton's vocals caught the attention of Antonio "L.A." Reid and Kenneth "Babyface" Edmonds who were in the process of forming LaFace Records. Eventually, Toni signed as a solo artist and started her career in 1992. In 1996, three out of the four Braxtons, Trina, Tamar and Towanda reunited and released their album So Many Ways. Their older sister Traci, did not join them as she was pregnant at the time they signed a new contract. The album produced four singles: "So Many Ways", "Only Love", "Slow Flow" and "The Boss"; the latter peaked at number-one in the Billboard Dance Charts.

Singles
"So Many Ways" was released as the lead single from the album  July 23, 1996. On August 17, 1996, The Braxtons released the video for the song, it was directed by Cameron Casey and featured actor Mekhi Phifer. The single was also used as the opening track for the soundtrack to the comedy film High School High.

The song charted at 83 on Billboard Hot 100 and 22 on US R&B/Hip-Hop Songs in the US. The song reached the top 40 in the UK charting at 32 and in New Zealand the song charted at 17. The trio also performed a remixed version of "So Many Ways" with rapper Jay-Z on September 9, 1996 at the Soul Train Lady of Soul Awards.

"Only Love" was released as the album's second single on January 25, 1997.  The song charted at #52 on Billboard'''s Hot R&B/Hip-Hop Songs spending fourteen weeks in total on the chart. The song charted at #3 on New Zealand's Top 40 chart. A music video for this song was also released.

"The Boss" was released as the album's third single in early 1997. A music video was released to promote the song. On February 1, 1997 the Masters At Work version topped the Billboard Hot Dance Club Play chart for one week a #1 in the United States. The song stayed in the chart for 14 weeks. On March 29, 1997 the song debuted at number 31 on the UK Singles Chart. The song spent a total of three weeks on the chart at numbers 50 and 69 respectively before leaving the Top 75 on April 12, 1997 becoming their second top 40 in the UK.

"Slow Flow" was released as the fourth and final single from the album. Despite failing to chart in the U.S. the song charted at #26 on UK Singles Chart becoming their highest chart to date. The song also charted in New Zealand at #38 on New Zealand Singles Chart. The Braxtons also served as the opening act for Toni Braxton on the European Leg of her Secrets Tour in 1997.

Commercial performanceSo Many Ways peaked at No. 26 on the Billboard R&B/Hip-Hop Albums charts. It reached #2 on the Heatseekers Albums chart.

 Track listing 

 Charts 

Release history

References

External links
 Next (Sep 1996): The Braxtons at Vibe''

1996 debut albums
The Braxtons albums
Albums produced by Jermaine Dupri